Stamford Senior Youth Theatre "(SSYT)" is a theatre company based in Stamford.

The company devises and produces a new original performance annually, usually written by the company's artistic director. The company operates on a yearly timeline which runs from September to July. The devised performances are debuted in the resident theatre and then toured throughout local schools and theatres. 
SSYT resides at the Stamford Arts Centre.

The company is a member of the National Association of Youth Theatres (NAYT) and attends the Middlesbrough Youth Drama Festival annually.

History

Mary Benzies started running the Senior Youth Theatre in 2007, in the first year produced 'Multiplex' by Christopher William Hill about staff at a multiplex cinema. This was a massive success at the box office and got rave reviews from local news.
This led to an increase of interest from young people who wished to get into performing arts. Mary chose to audition members for the 2008 Group instead of just letting everybody join. This meant that only selected members who were interested and dedicated to producing innovative, creative theatre would be accepted, leading to a massive boost in the professionalism and standard or performance by the company.

Funding 

SSYT is primarily funded by South Kesteven District Council and its company's members.

Company management

Class Teachers

 Mary Benzies  Company Director (2007–Present)
 Claudia Calardo  Choreographer (2009–Present)

Creative Team 

 Adrian Hill   Technical Director (2007–Present)

Notable Members
Previous notable members of SSYT:

Previous productions

 Multiplex (2008)
By Christopher William Hill

 DNA
 Unknown Writer

 Dress Up Day (2009)
By Mary Benzies

 TalkEase (2010)
By Mary Benzies

 Hang On (2011) 
By Mary Benzies

 Torchbearer (2012)
By Mary Benzies

References

External links 
  SSYT Website
  The SSYT page on Stamford Arts Centre's website
 SSYT's youtube page
 stamfordsyt SSYT's Facebook page

Stamford, Lincolnshire
Amateur theatre companies in England